The Otis Hare Archeological Site (also known as the Owen House Site) is a historic site near Bristol, Florida, at mile 73 on the east bank of the Apalachicola River. On July 26, 1989, it was added to the U.S. National Register of Historic Places.

References

External links
 Liberty County listings at Florida's Office of Cultural and Historical Programs

Geography of Liberty County, Florida
Archaeological sites on the National Register of Historic Places in Florida
National Register of Historic Places in Liberty County, Florida